Bolingbrook High School or The Brook is a public four-year Magnet School located in Bolingbrook, Illinois, a western suburb of Chicago, Illinois, in the United States. Bolingbrook High School is the second high school in the Valley View Community Unit School District 365U.

History

The original Bolingbrook High School campus, which opened in 1974, was located on Lee Lane and Blair Lane within the village. The former campus is now known as Brooks Middle School. Continued community growth prompted the passage of an April 2002 referendum for a new high school located at Schmidt Road and Lily Cache Lane, which opened in August 2004.

Academics
Bolingbrook was ranked as "recognized" nationally and 92 in Illinois in the U.S. News & World Report 2017 best high school rankings.

Demographics
The demographic breakdown of the 3,351 students enrolled for the 2020-21 school year was:
Male - 50.4%
Female - 49.6%
Native American/Alaskan - 0%
Asian/Pacific islanders - 7.2%
Black - 26.2%
Hispanic - 43.6%
White - 18.1%
Multiracial - 4.2%

57.0% of the students were eligible for free or reduced-cost lunch.  This is a Title I school.

Athletics
The Bolingbrook Raiders are members of the Southwest Suburban Conference.  The school colors are red, black and white.  The following Illinois High School Association (IHSA) sanctioned sports are offered:

Badminton (girls)
Baseball (boys)
Basketball (girls and boys)
Girls state champion - 2006, 2009, 2010, 2011
 3rd Place - 2020
Bowling (girls and boys)
Competitive cheerleading - (girls)
Competitive dance (girls)
Cross country (girls and boys)
Football (boys)
State champions - 2011
Golf (girls and boys)
Gymnastics (girls)
Soccer (girls and boys)
Softball (girls)
Swimming and diving (girls and boys)
Tennis (girls and boys)
Track and field (girls and boys) 
Volleyball (girls and boys)
Wrestling (boys)

Activities
The following IHSA sanctioned activities are offered:

Band
Chess team
Drama
Marching band
Newspaper
Tennis
Scholastic Bowl team
Speech
Vocal music

Notable alumni
 Kenneth Boatright, former NFL defensive end
Tuf Borland, American football linebacker for Ohio State University
 Troy Doris - current Olympic triple jumper; competed at 2016 Summer Olympics in Rio
 Robert Farmer - former NFL running back
 J.J. Furmaniak - former MLB infielder
 Anthony Herron - former NFL defensive end
 Ariel Massengale - assistant coach for Ole Miss women's basketball; former WNBA guard
 Susana Mendoza - Illinois Comptroller
 Tyler Mitchem – volleyball player on the United States men's national volleyball team.
Ben Moore (born 1995) - basketball player in the Israeli Basketball Premier League
 Antonio Morrison - free agent NFL linebacker
 Morgan Tuck - current power forward for WNBA's Connecticut Sun
 Greg Williams - current defensive backs coach for NFL's Arizona Cardinals
 Steve Williams - former NFL defensive end

References

External links

Valley View 365U Community Unit School District

Public high schools in Illinois
Bolingbrook, Illinois
Schools in Will County, Illinois
Educational institutions established in 1974
1974 establishments in Illinois